Cannabis on American Indian reservations historically largely fell under the same regulations as cannabis nationwide in the United States. However, the August 2013 issuance of the Cole Memorandum opened discussion on tribal sovereignty as pertains to cannabis legalization, which was further explored as the states of Washington and Colorado legalized marijuana. A clarifying memo in December 2014 stated that the federal government's non-interference policies that applied to the 50 states, would also apply to the 326 recognized American Indian reservations. U.S. Attorney for Oregon, Amanda Marshall, stated that the clarification had been issued in response to legal questions from tribal nations, but that only three unnamed tribes, in California, Washington state, and "the Midwest" had stated explicit interest in legalizing.

Oglala Sioux nation
The Oglala Sioux nation legalized industrial hemp in 1998, and the family of Alex White Plume began to produce the crop from 2000–2002, but federal authorities destroyed his crops and issued him a restraining order forbidding further cultivation.

In January 2014, the Oglala Sioux tribal council approved a proposal to hold a tribal vote to decide on legalizing marijuana on the Pine Ridge Indian Reservation in South Dakota, but the council later rejected the proposal.

Flandreau Santee Sioux Tribe
In mid-2015, the Flandreau Santee Sioux Tribe stated their intent to begin growing cannabis on one authorized site on their reservation, and commence selling the product on January 1, 2016, following a vote of tribal authorities which decided 5–1 to legalize cannabis. Under the regulation, buyers are required to consume the product on tribal property.

In November 2015, the tribe burned its cannabis crop after discussions with the state and federal attorney's general indicated they were at risk for a federal raid. A representative of the tribe stated in February 2016 that the tribe would pursue legislative solutions to move forward with their cannabis project.

Menominee Indian Reservation
In August 2015 the Menominee Indian Reservation in Wisconsin held a vote on proposed measures to legalize medical and/or recreational cannabis. The Menonimee are uniquely placed in the state, as the only American Indian reservation which falls only under federal law, rather than under Wisconsin Public Law 280 like all other reservations in the state, meaning that the state of Wisconsin cannot prevent legal changes within the sovereign reservation. In an "advisory vote", the tribal membership voted 77% in favor of legalizing medical cannabis, and 58% in favor of legalizing recreational; the tribal Chairman stated that tribal legislators would next decide whether to move forward on the two issues.

Navajo Nation
In 2016, the Navajo Nation signed its first resolution to grow industrial hemp.

Suquamish Tribe and Squaxin Island Tribe

The Squaxin Island Tribe opened the United States' first tribal-controlled cannabis store, "Elevation", in November 2015. The Suquamish Tribe in Western Washington began selling cannabis in December 2015, collecting the same 37% tax as the surrounding state. Both tribes legalized marijuana internally, and signed 10-year compacts with the Washington State Liquor and Cannabis Board.

The Squaxin Island Tribe's Island Enterprises began growing cannabis in 2017, in the Skokomish River Valley on what they called the state's first licensed outdoor farm.

2015 Modoc County raids
In July 2015, a joint operation by the Drug Enforcement Administration and the Bureau of Indian Affairs shut down grow operations on two reservations in Modoc County in Northern California. Plants and prepared cannabis were seized, but no arrests were made; news reporting indicated that the informant whose complaint sparked the raid was involved in a political power struggle with one of the growers, who is also her brother.

Puyallup
Commencement Bay Cannabis, operated by the Puyallup Tribe, opened on tribal property in Fife, Washington in 2017. The city does not allow cannabis sales, but the tribe operates outside the city's jurisdiction.

S’Klallam
In December, 2018, the Port Gamble Band of S’Klallam Indians entered a compact with the State of Washington to sell cannabis on its land.

Crow Tribe
The Crow Tribe of Montana legislative branch approved adult-use cannabis sales on April 16, 2021.

St. Regis Mohawk Tribe
The St. Regis Mohawk Tribe in New York legalized adult-use cannabis on June 28, 2021. Under the legislation, dispensaries must be licensed by the tribe, and all growing, processing, and sales must occur on tribal lands. Adult tribal members are permitted to grow up to twelve plants.

Opposition on tribal lands

The Washington Post in 2014 noted that the Yakama Nation of Washington State, following the state's legalization of cannabis, opposed legalization in ten state counties containing what the tribe considers its traditional lands.

See also
 Cannabis on Canadian Indian reserves
 Contemporary Native American issues in the United States
 Herbal medicine
 Traditional medicine
 Ethnobotany

References

Further reading

 
Native American health
Native American law